Chagan-Uzun (Çagan-Uzun) is a rural locality (a selo) in Kosh-Agachsky District, the Altai Republic, Russia. The population was 439 as of 2016. There are 5 streets.

Geography 
Chagan-Uzun is located 29 km northwest of Kosh-Agach (the district's administrative centre) by road. Ortolyk is the nearest rural locality.

References 

Rural localities in Kosh-Agachsky District